The 2008 United States House of Representatives elections in Oregon were held on November 4, 2008, to determine who will represent the state of Oregon in the United States House of Representatives, coinciding with the presidential and senatorial elections. Representatives are elected for two-year terms those elected will be serving in the 111th Congress from January 3, 2009 until January 3, 2011.

Oregon has five seats in the House, apportioned according to the 2000 United States Census. Its 2007–2008 congressional delegation consisted of four Democrats and one Republican. This remains unchanged although CQ Politics had forecasted district 5 to be at some risk for the incumbent party earlier in the year.

A primary election for Democrats and Republicans was held on May 20. To be eligible for the primaries, candidates had to file for election by March 11. Other parties had other procedures for nominating candidates.

Overview

District 1

 

Democratic incumbent David Wu has represented Oregon's 1st congressional district since 1998 and is the Democratic nominee in 2008, defeating Will Hobbs and Mark Welyczko in the primary. Hobbs, a political novice, earned some attention late in the race, by winning the endorsements of major newspapers The Oregonian and Willamette Week. He won 16.7% of the vote to Wu's 78.0%.

In the Republican primary, Joel Haugen defeated pathologist Claude W. Chappell IV, but later withdrew his acceptance of the Republican nomination after his endorsement of Democrat Barack Obama for President drew objections from Republican party leaders.

Democratic primary

Candidates

Results

Republican primary

Candidates

Results

General election

Candidates

Results

District 2

Incumbent Republican Greg Walden has represented Oregon's 2nd congressional district since 1998 and was unopposed for the Republican nomination in 2008. In the general election, he faced Democrat Noah Lemas, a small business owner, Richard Hake of the Constitution Party of Oregon and Pacific Green Party candidate Tristin Mock.

Democratic primary

Candidates

Results

Republican primary

Candidates

Results

General election

Candidates

Results

District 3

Incumbent Democrat Earl Blumenauer has represented Oregon's 3rd congressional district since 1996 and was the Democratic nominee in 2008, defeating TV co-host John Sweeney and retired utility worker and peace activist Joseph "Lone Vet" Walsh in the primary. In the general election, he faced Republican Delia Lopez, a real estate investor, and Pacific Green Party candidate Michael Meo.

Democratic primary

Candidates

Results

Republican primary

Candidates

Results

General election

Candidates

Results

District 4

Incumbent Democrat Peter DeFazio has represented Oregon's 4th congressional district since 1986 and was unopposed for the Democratic nomination in 2008. He was being challenged in the general election by Constitution Party member Jaynee Germond and Pacific Green Mike Beilstein, a research chemist. CQ Politics forecasted the race as 'Safe Democrat'.

Democratic primary

Candidates

Results

Republican primary

Candidates

Results

General election

Candidates

Results

District 5

In February 2008, Democrat Darlene Hooley, who had represented Oregon's 5th congressional district since 1996, announced that she would not seek re-election in 2008. The race to replace her was expected to be one of the most competitive in the nation, since the district contained about 2,000 more Republicans than Democrats at that time. 

There were two major factors for the competitiveness of the race: first, the demographics of the district had changed dramatically. In June, there were 20,000 more registered Democrats than Republicans in the district, a net swing of 22,000 voters since February. Secondly, Republican nominee Erickson won a contentious primary in which an opponent, Kevin Mannix, raised an allegation that Erickson paid for a former girlfriend's abortion. The girlfriend subsequently went public with the information, but Erickson denied knowledge of the event. Mannix refused to endorse Erickson in the general election.

Democratic nominee Kurt Schrader won against Republican nominee Mike Erickson, 166,070 (54.3%) to 116,418 (38.3%). Also competing were Libertarian nominee Steve Milligan, Constitution nominee Douglas Patterson, Pacific Green nominee Alex Polikoff, and Independent Sean Bates.

Democratic primary

Candidates

Results

Republican primary

Candidates

Results

General election

Candidates

Results

See also
 United States House of Representatives elections, 2008
 United States presidential election in Oregon, 2008
 United States Senate election in Oregon, 2008
 Oregon state elections, 2008

References

External links
U.S. Congress candidates for Oregon at Project Vote Smart
Oregon U.S. House Races from 2008 Race Tracker
Campaign contributions for Oregon congressional races from OpenSecrets

2008
Oregon
United States House of Representatives